The House of Branching Love is a 2009 Finnish comedy-drama film directed by Mika Kaurismäki. It is based on the novel Haarautuvan rakkauden talo by Petri Karra. The film is about a married couple going through a divorce.

Cast 
 Hannu-Pekka Björkman as Juhani Helin
 Elina Knihtilä as Tuula Helin
 Kati Outinen as Yrsa
 Antti Reini as Wolffi
 Tommi Eronen as Pekka
 Irina Björklund as Marjut
 Maria Järvenhelmi as Kitty
 Kari Väänänen as Niilo
 Anna Easteden as Nina
 Ilkka Villi as Marco
 Antti Virmavirta as Timo
 Mari Perankoski as Tiina
 Timo Torikka as PK

References

External links 
 
 

2009 comedy-drama films
2009 films
Films based on Finnish novels
Films directed by Mika Kaurismäki
Films set in Finland
Films shot in Finland
Finnish comedy-drama films
2000s Finnish-language films